Dindi is a village in East Godavari district on the intersection where the Godavari River joins the Bay of Bengal, known for coconut plantations and resorts. In 2015 GAIL acquired 400-metre site in to lay a gas pipeline from its refinery at Tatipaka to the Lanco power plant at Kondapalli in Krishna District. Because of various resorts, houseboats, and natural backdrop, it is one of the preferred offbeat destinations for Hyderabadis.

References

External links

Cities and towns in East Godavari district